The 2013–14 Georgia Southern Eagles men's basketball team represented Georgia Southern University during the 2013–14 NCAA Division I men's basketball season. The Eagles, led by first year head coach Mark Byington, played their home games at Hanner Fieldhouse and were members of the Southern Conference. They finished the season 15–19, 6–10 in SoCon play to finish in a tie for seventh place. They advanced to the semifinals of the SoCon tournament where they lost to Wofford.

This was their last season as a member of the SoCon as they will join the Sun Belt Conference in July, 2014.

Roster

Schedule

|-
!colspan=9 style="background:#000080; color:#FFFFFF;"| Exhibition

|-
!colspan=9 style="background:#000080; color:#FFFFFF;"| Regular season

|-
!colspan=9 style="background:#000080; color:#FFFFFF;"| 2014 SoCon tournament

References

Georgia Southern Eagles men's basketball seasons
Georgia Southern